João Pedro Bellard Belo (born 21 May 1910 - deceased) was a Portuguese footballer who played as defender.

Football career 

Belo gained one cap for Portugal against Spain 2 April 1933 in Vigo, in a 0–3 defeat.

External links 
 
 

1910 births
Portuguese footballers
Association football defenders
Primeira Liga players
C.F. Os Belenenses players
Portugal international footballers
Year of death missing